Frederick I may refer to:

 Frederick of Utrecht or Frederick I (815/16–834/38), Bishop of Utrecht.                      
 Frederick I, Duke of Upper Lorraine (942–978)
 Frederick I, Duke of Swabia (1050–1105)
 Frederick I, Count of Zollern (died 1125)
 Frederick I (archbishop of Cologne) (1075–1171)
 Frederick I, Holy Roman Emperor (1122–1190), "Frederick Barbarossa"
 Frederick I, Burgrave of Nuremberg (1139–1200)
 Frederick I, Duke of Lorraine (1143–1206)
 Frederick I, Count of Berg-Altena (1173–1198)
 Frederick I, Duke of Austria (Babenberg) (1175–1198), "Frederick the Catholic"
 Frederick I, Margrave of Baden (1249–1268)
 Frederick I, Margrave of Meissen (1257–1323), "the Brave"
 Frederick I of Austria (Habsburg) (1286–1330), "Frederick the Fair"
 Frederick I, Marquess of Saluzzo (1287–1336)
 Frederick I, Count of Celje (1300-59)
 Frederick I, Duke of Athens (died 1355)
 Frederick I, Elector of Saxony (1370–1428), "the Belligerent" or "the Warlike"
 Frederick I, Elector of Brandenburg (1371–1440), also Burgrave of Nuremberg (as Frederick VI)
 Frederick I, Count of Vaudémont (1371–1415)
 Frederick I, Duke of Brunswick-Lüneburg (died 1400)
 Frederick I, Count Palatine of Simmern (1417–1480), "the Hunsrücker"
 Frederick I, Duke of Brunswick-Osterode (died 1421)
 Frederick I, Elector Palatine (1425–1476), "the Victorious"
 Frederick I of Mantua (1441–1484), Marquess of Mantua
 Frederick I of Naples (1452–1504), King of Naples
 Frederick I, Margrave of Brandenburg-Ansbach (1460–1536)
 Frederick I of Denmark (1471–1533), King of Denmark and Norway
 Frederick I, Duke of Württemberg (1557–1608)
 Frederick I, Landgrave of Hesse-Homburg (1585–1638)
 Frederick I, Duke of Saxe-Gotha-Altenburg (1646–1691)
 Frederick I of Prussia (1657–1713), King in Prussia
 Frederick I of Sweden (1676–1751), King of Sweden
 Frederick I of Württemberg (1754–1816), King of Württemberg
 Frederick I, Duke of Saxe-Altenburg (1763–1834)
 Frederick I, Grand Duke of Baden (1826–1907)
 Frederick I, Duke of Anhalt (1831–1904)

See also
 Frederik I (disambiguation)
 Frederick William I (disambiguation)